James D. McElroy (November 5, 1862 – February 24, 1889) was an American professional baseball player who played one season at the major league level.  He pitched thirteen games for the  Philadelphia Quakers, and one game for the Wilmington Quicksteps.  His W–L record was 1–13, and he had an earned run average of 5.12.  He attended Saint Mary's College of California in Moraga, California.

He is first seen on May 2, 1884, pitching for the Baltimore Monumentals of the Eastern League, when he pitched against the Quicksteps.  Before the 1884 season, Harry Wright took over as the Phillies manager, and liked McElroy's talent.  He threw extremely hard, but was very wild.  In his 14 starts, there were seven different catchers who caught him, four of whom claimed that McElroy was the first pitcher they had ever caught at the major league level.  In an era when catcher's equipment was still very meager, and with no other catchers willing to work with McElroy, Wright had to release him.

McElroy died in Needles, California of an intentional opium overdose.

References
General
Nemec, David;Zemen, Davis. 2004. The baseball rookies encyclopedia. Brassey's. .
Specific

External links

 Jim McElroy at SABR (Baseball BioProject)

1862 births
1889 deaths
Baseball players from California
Major League Baseball pitchers
Philadelphia Quakers players
Wilmington Quicksteps players
People from Napa County, California
Drug-related suicides in California
19th-century baseball players
San Francisco Reddingtons players
Baltimore Monumentals (minor league) players
Norfolk (minor league baseball) players
Sportspeople from San Bernardino County, California
Springfield (minor league baseball) players
Saint Mary's Gaels baseball players
People from Needles, California
1880s suicides